The Woman on the Jury is a lost 1924 American silent drama film produced and released by Associated First National and directed by Harry Hoyt. It is based on a Broadway stage play, The Woman on the Jury, and stars Sylvia Breamer and Bessie Love. The story was refilmed in 1929 as an early talkie under the title The Love Racket starring Dorothy Mackaill.

Production 
The film was primarily shot at night so that the cast and crew could work on other films during the day.

Plot 
In the Adirondacks, notorious philanderer George Montgomery (Cody) is murdered, and his former sweetheart Grace (Love) is put on trial. Betty Brown (Breamer) and her husband Fred Masters (Mayo) both serve on the jury. When the defendant is nearly wrongfully convicted, Betty reveals her own history with the murder victim—that she once had been in love with him and tried to kill him—proves that the defendant is innocent.

Cast

Reception 
The film received generally positive reviews, and Breamer's performance was particularly well-reviewed.

Preservation
With no copies of The Woman on the Jury located in any film archives, it is a lost film.

References 
Notes

Citations

External links

 
 
 
 Film review at Variety

1924 drama films
1924 lost films
1924 films
American black-and-white films
American courtroom films
American films based on plays
American legal drama films
American silent feature films
Films directed by Harry O. Hoyt
Lost American films
Lost drama films
1920s American films
Silent American drama films
1920s English-language films